Cameron Guthrie (born 19 August 1992) is an Australian rules footballer for the Geelong Football Club in the Australian Football League (AFL).

AFL career
Guthrie was drafted with the 23rd selection in the 2010 AFL draft after playing for the Calder Cannons in the TAC Cup.  He was allocated the No. 29 jumper, previously worn by Gary Ablett, Jr., who had left Geelong to become the new Gold Coast Football Club's inaugural captain.

He made his AFL debut in the opening round of the 2011 AFL season in Geelong's thrilling one-point win over St Kilda.

He went on to play one more game in the 2011 home and away season, missing out on the 2011 Finals Series. He afterwards played 18 of the 23 home and away season games with the Geelong Cats Securing his position as a regular for the years to come. He is the brother of Ben Guthrie, a journalist with afl.com.au.

After the 2016 rookie draft, Guthrie was joined by his youngest brother Zach Guthrie at Geelong.

In 2020 Guthrie had a career-best year and was awarded with his first All Australian selection, as well as his first Carji Greeves Medal.

2022 was another strong season for Guthrie, as he became a premiership player alongside his brother in the Cats' 81-point thumping of Sydney. He also won his second Carji Greeves Medal alongside teammate Jeremy Cameron.

Statistics
Updated to the end of the 2022 season.

|- 
| 2011 ||  || 29
| 2 || 0 || 0 || 8 || 13 || 21 || 4 || 5 || 0.0 || 0.0 || 4.0 || 6.5 || 10.5 || 2.0 || 2.5 || 0
|-
| 2012 ||  || 29
| 18 || 1 || 0 || 100 || 97 || 197 || 42 || 44 || 0.1 || 0.0 || 5.6 || 5.4 || 10.9 || 2.3 || 2.4 || 0
|- 
| 2013 ||  || 29
| 20 || 5 || 2 || 143 || 114 || 257 || 75 || 55 || 0.3 || 0.1 || 7.2 || 5.7 || 12.9 || 3.8 || 2.8 || 0
|-
| 2014 ||  || 29
| 24 || 4 || 7 || 203 || 241 || 444 || 72 || 124 || 0.2 || 0.3 || 8.5 || 10.0 || 18.5 || 3.0 || 5.1 || 0
|- 
| 2015 ||  || 29
| 21 || 13 || 7 || 192 || 261 || 453 || 69 || 110 || 0.6 || 0.3 || 9.1 || 12.4 || 21.6 || 3.3 || 5.2 || 6
|-
| 2016 ||  || 29
| 23 || 12 || 7 || 226 || 301 || 527 || 75 || 77 || 0.5 || 0.3 || 9.3 || 13.1 || 22.9 || 3.3 || 3.4 || 3
|- 
| 2017 ||  || 29
| 20 || 4 || 5 || 140 || 224 || 364 || 55 || 85 || 0.2 || 0.3 || 7.0 || 11.2 || 18.2 || 2.8 || 4.3 || 0
|-
| 2018 ||  || 29
| 13 || 3 || 0 || 99 || 113 || 212 || 34 || 39 || 0.2 || 0.0 || 7.6 || 8.7 || 16.3 || 2.6 || 3.0 || 0
|- 
| 2019 ||  || 29
| 20 || 10 || 4 || 191 || 177 || 368 || 70 || 98 || 0.5 || 0.2 || 9.6 || 8.9 || 18.4 || 3.5 || 4.9 || 1
|-
| 2020 ||  || 29
| 21 || 7 || 2 || 225 || 222 || 447 || 95 || 86 || 0.3 || 0.1 || 10.7 || 10.6 || 21.3 || 4.5 || 4.1 || 14
|- 
| 2021 ||  || 29
| 23 || 4 || 8 || 342 || 325 || 667 || 129|| 92 || 0.2 || 0.3 || 14.9 || 14.1 || 29.0 || 5.6 || 4.0 || 18
|-
| scope=row bgcolor=F0E68C | 2022# ||  || 29
|| 25 || 12 || 12 || 316 || 297 || 623 || 90 || 124 || 0.5 || 0.5 || 12.5 || 12.3 || 24.8 || 3.7 || 5.0 || 13
|- class=sortbottom
! colspan=3 | Career
! 230 !! 75 !! 54 !! 2185 !! 2385 !! 4570 !! 810 !! 939 !! 0.3 !! 0.2 !! 9.5 !! 10.4 !! 19.9 !! 3.5 !! 4.1 !! 55
|}

Notes

Honours and achievements
Team
 AFL premiership player: 2022
 2× McClelland Trophy: 2019, 2022

Individual
2× Carji Greeves Medal: 2020, 2022
 All-Australian team: 2020
 Geelong F.C. Best Young Player Award: 2014

References

External links

Geelong Football Club players
Geelong Football Club Premiership players
Living people
1992 births
Australian rules footballers from Victoria (Australia)
Calder Cannons players
All-Australians (AFL)
One-time VFL/AFL Premiership players
Carji Greeves Medal winners
People from Sunbury, Victoria